The U.S. State of Colorado has designated 95 natural areas of the state for special protection. The Colorado Natural Areas Program was established in 1977 to preserve and protect special areas of the state with distinctive flora, fauna, ecological, geological, and paleontologic features. It is a program of Colorado Parks and Wildlife that identifies and protects public, and in some cases private, areas with at least one unique or high-quality natural feature of statewide significance. Land management agreements are made with landowners concerning private property.


Natural areas
The Colorado Natural Areas are:
Aiken Canyon Natural Area
Antero-Salt Creek Natural Area
Arikaree River Natural Area
Badger Wash Natural Area
Blacks Gulch Natural Area
Blue Mountain Natural Area
Bonny Prairie Natural Area
Boulder Mountain Park Natural Area in Boulder Mountain Park
Brush Creek Fen Natural Area
California Park Natural Area
Castlewood Canyon Natural Area in Castlewood Canyon State Park
Chalk Bluffs Natural Area
Colorado Tallgrass Prairie Natural Area
Comanche Grassland Lesser Prairie Chicken Natural Area in Comanche National Grassland
Copeland Willow Carr Natural Area
Corral Bluffs Natural Area
Cross Mountain Canyon Natural Area
Dakota Hogback Natural Area commonly known as Dinosaur Ridge in Matthews/Winters Park
Deer Gulch Natural Area
Dome Rock Natural Area in Dome Rock State Wildlife Area
Droney Gulch Natural Area
Duck Creek Natural Area
Dudley Bluffs Natural Area
East Lost Park Natural Area in Pike National Forest
East Sand Dunes Natural Area in State Forest State Park
Elephant Rocks Natural Area
Escalante Canyon Natural Area
Fairview Natural Area
Fourmile Creek Natural Area
Fruita Paleontological Locality
Garden Park Fossil Locality
Gateway Palisade Natural Area
Geneva Basin Iron Fens Natural Area
Gothic Research Natural Area in Gunnison National Forest
Gunnison Gravels Research Natural Area
Haviland Lake Natural Area in Haviland Lake State Wildlife Area
High Creek Fen Natural Area
High Mesa Grassland Natural Area
Hoosier Ridge Research Natural Area on the Continental Divide in Pike National Forest and White River National Forest
Hurricane Canyon Natural Area in Pike National Forest
Indian Spring Natural Area
Indian Springs Trace Fossil Locality
Irish Canyon Natural Area
Jimmy Creek Natural Area
Ken-Caryl Ranch Natural Area
Kremmling Cretaceous Ammonite Locality
Limestone Ridge Natural Area
Logan Wash Mine Natural Area
Lookout Mountain Natural Area
Lower Greasewood Creek Natural Area
McElmo Natural Area
Mexican Cut Natural Area
Mini-Wheeler Natural Area
Miramonte Reservoir Natural Area in Dan Noble State Wildlife Area
Mishak Lakes Natural Area
Mount Callahan Natural Area
Mount Callahan Saddle Natural Area
Mount Emmons Iron Fen Natural Area in Gunnison National Forest
Mount Goliath Natural Area in Arapaho National Forest
Narraguinnep Natural Area in San Juan National Forest
Needle Rock Natural Area
North Park Phacelia Natural Area
Orient Mine Natural Area
Owl Canyon Pinyon Grove Natural Area
Pagosa Skyrocket Natural Area
Paradise Park Natural Area in Rocky Mountain National Park
Park Creek Hogback Natural Area
Pyramid Rock Natural Area
Rabbit Valley Natural Area
Rajadero Canyon Natural Area
Raven Ridge Natural Area
Redcloud Peak Natural Area
Rough Canyon Natural Area
Roxborough Natural Area in and near Roxborough State Park
Ryan Gulch Natural Area
Saddle Mountain Natural Area in Pike National Forest
San Miguel River at Tabeguache Creek Natural Area
Sand Creek Natural Area
Shell Duck Creek Natural Area
Shell Rock Natural Area
Slumgullion Earthflow Natural Area in San Juan National Forest
South Beaver Creek Natural Area
South Boulder Creek Natural Area
South Cathedral Bluffs Natural Area
Specimen Mountain Research Natural Area in Rocky Mountain National Park
Staunton Natural Area in Staunton State Park
Tamarack Ranch Natural Area in Tamarack Ranch State Wildlife Area
Treasurevault Mountain Natural Area
Trinidad K-T Boundary Natural Area in Trinidad Lake State Park
Two Buttes Natural Area
Unaweep Seep Research Natural Area
Wacker Ranch Natural Area
West Creek Natural Area in Rocky Mountain National Park
Wheeler Geologic Natural Area in the La Garita Wilderness of Rio Grande National Forest
White Rocks Natural Area
Yanks Gulch/Upper Greasewood Creek Natural Area
Zapata Falls Natural Area

See also

State of Colorado
Colorado Department of Natural Resources
Colorado Parks and Wildlife
List of Colorado natural areas
List of Colorado state parks
List of Colorado state wildlife areas
List of protected areas of Colorado

References

External links

Colorado state government website
Colorado Department of Natural Resources website
Colorado Parks and Wildlife website
Colorado Natural Areas Program
Map of Colorado Natural Areas

Colorado geography-related lists
Environment of Colorado
Nature reserves in Colorado
Protected areas of Colorado
Colorado natural areas, List of
Colorado natural areas, List of